

Sơn Tây is a district-level town ("thị xã") in Hanoi, the capital of Vietnam. It was the capital of Sơn Tây province before merging with Hà Đông province to form Hà Tây province in 1965. Sơn Tây lies 35 km west of the capital Hanoi. It had a city status in Hà Tây province. However, when Hà Tây was absorbed into Hanoi, Sơn Tây was demoted from a city to a town.

It is often referred to as “soldier town” due to the proliferation of army barracks and military institutions that surrounds the town, including the Vietnamese People's Army Infantry Academy.

Sơn Tây's future is seen as being very much that of a satellite city of Hanoi and as a result there are plans to relocate universities and other public facilities to Sơn Tây where land is cheaper and more plentiful. The government has planned to complete this project by duplicating the main Hanoi—Sơn Tây carriageway which is expected to be completed in 2009.

History 

Sơn Tây is known for its thousand year old villages, such as Đường Lâm which retains a collection of vernacular architecture with buildings and temples built using laterite bricks. Và Temple, or Đông Cung, dedicated to Tản Viên, is located on a hill covered with ironwood trees in Vân Giã hamlet, Trung Hưng commune. Phạm Văn Đổng, a general, was from Sơn Tây.

Climate

Administrative Divisions
The town of Sơn Tây occupies most of the district, and is subdivided in wards. Eight wards form the urban core, while Xuân Khanh, to the west, is a distant ward, discontinuous with the central area.  The district also includes six rural communes: Cổ Đông, Đường Lâm, Kim Sơn, Sơn Đông, Thanh Mỹ, and Xuân Sơn.

See also 
 Sơn Tây Campaign
 Operation Ivory Coast

References

External links
 Duong Lam village travel guide and tips
 Cổng thông tin Người Sơn Tây
 Diễn đàn Người Sơn Tây
  Hanoi province and its subdivisions

Districts of Hanoi
Populated places in Hanoi
County-level towns in Vietnam